The men's qualification for football tournament at the 1995 All-Africa Games.

Qualification stage

Zone I (North Africa)
Libya and Morocco withdrew.

|}

Algeria qualified.

Zone II (West Africa 1)
First round

|}

Second round

|}

Third round

|}

Guinea qualified.

Zone III (West Africa 2)
First round

|}

Second round

|}

Nigeria qualified.

Zone IV (Central Africa)
First round

|}

Second round

|}

Congo qualified.

Zone V (East Africa)
First round

|}

Second round

|}

Egypt qualified.

Zone VI (Southern Africa)
First round

|}

Second round

|}

Third round

|}

Zambia qualified.

Zone VII (Indian Ocean)

|}

Mauritius qualified.

Qualifying teams
The following countries have qualified for the final tournament:

External links
African Games 1995 - Rec.Sport.Soccer Statistics Foundation

Qualification
1995